Groß Kordshagen is a municipality in the Vorpommern-Rügen district, in Mecklenburg-Vorpommern, Germany.

Geography
Groß Kordshagen is between the cities Barth (distance: 8 km) and Stralsund (distance: 18 km)
The municipality includes the villages Groß Kordshagen, Arbshagen and Flemendorf.

Sightseeing
 Church "Marienkirche" in Flemendorf
 Manor House Groß Kordshagen
 Manor House Arbshagen

Economy
There are two types of business in Groß Kordshagen: tourism (apartments, campsite, restaurant and a cafe) and agriculture

References